Keith Edgar Knight Jr. (born August 24, 1966) is an American cartoonist and musician known for his accessible yet subversive comic strips The K Chronicles, (Th)ink, and The Knight Life. While his work is humorous and universal in appeal, he also often deals with political, social, and racial issues. Woke, a television series based on his work, debuted in 2020.

Biography and personal life 
Knight was born in Malden, Massachusetts, and raised in the Boston area. Previously a resident of San Francisco, in 2007 he moved to Los Angeles. He is now based in the Research Triangle area of North Carolina.

He is married to German-born illustrator Kerstin Konietzka-Knight, and they have two children; they appear as characters in The K Chronicles and The Knight Life.  (The timeline of The Knight Life is about two years behind The K Chronicles.) Knight often pokes gentle fun at his wife's mangling of English idioms.  Their first son is not referred to by name, but is sometimes referred to as "The Unbearable Cuteness of Being."

Career 

Knight's regular feature The K Chronicles, launched in the early 1990s, appears in various outlets, including Daily Kos, and previously appeared in the San Francisco Examiner, while (th)ink is published on several newspapers and websites, especially African-American sites.  A syndicated daily strip, The Knight Life, was launched in 2008. Knight is also the artist for two strips appearing in Mad: Father O'Flannity's Hot Tub Confessions and Bully Baby.

In the March 14, 2012, strip of The K Chronicles, Knight announced he was working on a graphic novel about his brief (1984–1985) career as a professional Michael Jackson impersonator. The book will be entitled I Was a Teenage Michael Jackson Impersonator.

Knight also appeared in The Marginal Prophets, a hip-hop band.

Knight has become a public speaker, with comic strip slideshows addressing racial illiteracy, police brutality and the role it has played since the early years of the United States.

In November 2018 it was announced that Hulu would be producing a half-hour sitcom, titled Woke, based on The K Chronicles and events from Knight's life. The show is co-written by Knight; actor Lamorne Morris plays Knight. Woke debuted on September 9, 2020. On November 17, 2020, Hulu renewed the series for a second season.

Awards 
In 2007, The K Chronicles won the Harvey Kurtzman Award for Best Syndicated Comic Strip. The other nominees were Antiques: The Comic Strip, Doonesbury, Maakies, and Mutts.

The K Chronicles has won the Glyph Awards Best Comic Strip multiple times, including  2006, 2007, 2009, and 2010.

In 2010, Knight was presented with an Inkpot Award for career achievement at the San Diego Comic-Con.

 2015 NAACP History Maker Award
 2015 Belle Foundation grant recipient

Bibliography 

Dances with Sheep (1997, Manic D Press). 
Fear of a Black Marker (2000, Manic D Press). 
What a Long Strange Strip It's Been  (2002, Top Shelf Productions). 
Red, White, Black & Blue: a (th)ink anthology (2004, Manic D Press). 

Are We Feeling Safer Yet? A (th)ink Anthology (2007, Top Shelf Productions). 
The Complete K Chronicles, a compilation of the first four K Chronicles books (2008, Dark Horse Comics). 
Beginner's Guide to Community-Based Arts (2005, New Village Press). 
I Left my Arse in San Francisco (2008, Keith Knight Press)
Too Small To Fail: A (th)ink Anthology (2009, Keith Knight Press)
 The Knight Life: "Chivalry Ain't Dead" (2010, Grand Central Publishing). 
 The Incredible Cuteness of Being (2012, Keith Knight Press). 
 25 Steps to a Better Kickstarter Campaign (2013, Keith Knight Press)
 Knight Takes Queen: The 2nd Knight Life Collection (2015, Keith Knight Press). 
 They Shoot Black People, Don't They? (2015, Keith Knight Press)
 Go East, Young Fam! (2016, Keith Knight Press). 
 Make America Hate Again: A (th)ink Anthology (2016, Keith Knight Press)
 Jake the Fake Keeps It Real (2017 Crown Books)
 Tribespotting: Undercover Cult(ure) Stories, by Harmon Leon, cartoonist, (2019, 39 West Press).

Discography (with Marginal Prophets) 
Twist the Nob (1997)
dead hippie bootleg : the Marginal Prophets live!! (2002)
Bohemian Rap CD (2004)

Filmography 
Revengeance, voice actor (2017)
Drawn Together, featured subject (2017)
 Woke, co-creator (2020–2021)

References

Further reading

External links

1966 births
African-American comics creators
American comics creators
American cartoonists
Living people
People from Malden, Massachusetts
Salem State University alumni
21st-century African-American people
20th-century African-American people